Northern Marianas Athletics (NMA), also known as Northern Marianas Athletics Association or Northern Mariana Islands Track and Field Federation, is the governing body for the sport of athletics in Northern Mariana Islands.

History 
Athletes from the Northern Marianas participated already at the 1969 Micronesian Games, (the Northern Marianas then still being part of the Trust Territory of the Pacific Islands,) and at the 1975 South Pacific Games as part of a combined Micronesia team.

The foundation of NMA is reported for 1980, as well as its affiliation to the IAAF in the year 1989.

Kurt Barnes served as president of NMA until he stepped down in 2009.

Current president is former congressman Ray Tebuteb.

Affiliations 
International Association of Athletics Federations (IAAF)
Oceania Athletics Association (OAA)
Moreover, it is part of the following national organisations:
Northern Marianas Sports Association (NMSA)

National records 
NMA maintains the Northern Mariana Islands records in athletics.

External links
Official Webpage

References 

Northern Mariana Islands
Sports in the Northern Mariana Islands
Athletics in the Northern Mariana Islands
National governing bodies for athletics
Sports organizations established in 1980
1980 establishments in Oceania